Bayu Mohamad Fiqri (born 10 August 2001) is an Indonesian professional footballer who plays as a full-back for Liga 1 club PSIS Semarang, on loan from Persib Bandung, and the Indonesia national team.

Club career

Persib Bandung
He was signed for Persib Bandung to play in Liga 1 in the 2021 season. Bayu made his first-team debut on 4 September 2021 in a match against Barito Putera at the Indomilk Arena, Tangerang.

PSIS Semarang (loan)
Persib's versatile defender, Bayu Fiqri, is on loan from Laskar Mahesa Jenar until the end of the 2022–23 Liga 1 season. Bayu made his professional debut on 16 January 2023 in a match against RANS Nusantara at the Pakansari Stadium, Bogor.

International career
In August 2020, Fiqri was included on Indonesia national under-19 football team 30-man list for Training Center in Croatia. He earned his first under-19 cap on 8 September 2020 in 1–7 loss against Croatia U19.

In October 2021, Fiqri was called up to the Indonesia U23 in a friendly match against Tajikistan and Nepal and also prepared for 2022 AFC U-23 Asian Cup qualification in Tajikistan by Shin Tae-yong. On 22 October 2021, Fiqri debuted in the under-23 team when he coming as a starter in a 2–0 win against Nepal U23.

In January 2022, Fiqri was called up to the senior team in a friendly match in Bali by Shin Tae-yong. He earned his first cap in a 3–0 win friendly match against Timor Leste on 30 January 2022.

Career statistics

Club

Notes

International

References

External links
 Bayu Fiqri at Soccerway

2001 births
Living people
Indonesian footballers
Persib Bandung players
Liga 1 (Indonesia) players
Sportspeople from East Java
People from Banyuwangi Regency
Association football defenders
Indonesia youth international footballers
Indonesia international footballers